Stephen A. Diamond, Ph.D. (born 1951) is a licensed American clinical and forensic psychologist, a former pupil and protégé of Dr. Rollo May, and notable author of Anger, Madness, and the Daimonic: The Psychological Genesis of Violence, Evil, and Creativity (with foreword by Rollo May, SUNY Press, 1996). His work focuses on the psychological topics of anger, violence, evil, mental illness, and the daimonic.

Biography
After practicing in the San Francisco Bay Area for more than 20 years, he relocated in 1999 to Los Angeles, where he currently resides and maintains a private psychotherapy practice in the Beverly Hills area. In addition to specializing in adult psychotherapy and what he calls "existential depth psychology," Dr. Diamond was for many years a designated forensic psychologist for the Los Angeles County Superior Court (Criminal Division). He was a resident faculty member in the Department of Psychology at both Argosy University and Ryokan College in Los Angeles, served as a clinical supervisor at The Chicago School of Professional Psychology, and taught most recently at Loyola Marymount University. He currently serves on the Board of Editors of the Journal of Humanistic Psychology.

Selected bibliography
 Contributor to Meeting the Shadow by C.Zweig & J.Abrams (1991), Tarcher: 
 Anger, Madness, and the Daimonic: The Psychological Genesis of Violence, Evil, and Creativity (1996), SUNY Press: 
 Contributor to Contemporary Theory and Practice in Counseling and Psychotherapy by H. Tinsley, S.Lease, & N. Wiersma (SAGE, 2015)

See also
 Carl Jung
 Humanistic psychology

References

Living people
1951 births
Forensic psychologists
American clinical psychologists